The Franciscans of Primitive Observance is an association of the faithful founded in 1995 under the Roman Catholic Archdiocese of Boston that observes the Rule of Saint Francis in the Capuchin tradition. Their community population is divided between two residences; namely, Our Lady of Guadalupe Friary at 3 Magazine Street in Roxbury, MA and Friary of St. Joseph on 10 Highgate Street in Lawrence, MA.

History 
In 1994, six members of the Franciscan Friars of the Renewal, Pio Mandato, Joe Nolan, David Engo, Francis Kelly, John Sweeney, and Peter Giroux, sought to found a new community in order to pursue an authentic observance of the life and Rule of Saint Francis. They petitioned the bishop of Fall River, Massachusetts, Seán Patrick O'Malley, for support. O'Malley agreed to serve as Ordinary of the new group, which was named Capuchin Recollects, and he assisted them in composing their rule and constitutions.  On April 21, 1996, the six founders professed perpetual vows before O'Malley and established their friary in New Bedford, Massachusetts. Subsequent houses of the community were opened in Stamford, Vermont, where novices were formed, Emmitsburg, Maryland, and Nicaragua.

In 1996 the community changed its name from Capuchin Recollects to Franciscans of Primitive Observance.

After O'Malley was appointed as the Archbishop of the Archdiocese of Boston in 2003, the Franciscans of Primitive Observance requested to be transferred from the Fall River diocese and incardinated in the Boston Archdiocese. Upon approval, the friars relocated to Lawrence, Massachusetts, closing the friary in New Bedford. In 2010 they opened a second house in Roxbury. Currently they have one friary in Lawrence.

Governance 
Peter Giroux has served as the community's General Servant for the majority of the Franciscans of Primitive Observance's existence. Fr. Andrew Beauregard was superior from 2015 to 2018.

The catholic young adult group, Pure in Heart Lawrence, regards Andrew Beauregard as its spiritual director.

Controversy 
In 2000, the Tifft family donated the use of their estate in Vermont to the Franciscans of Primitive Observance to conduct a retreat for their members, during which they conducted exorcisms. The Tifft family alleged that John Sweeney, one of the founding figures, used these and similar occasions to serially sexually abuse and victimize teenage women, including the Tifft's 17-year-old daughter. Sweeney was put on leave in 2004, and subsequently laicized in 2013.

Women's community 
Along with the founding of the friars' community out of the Franciscan Friars of the Renewal, six women left the corresponding women's community, the Franciscan Sisters of the Renewal, in 1994, to form the Capuchin Recollect Sisters in New Bedford, Massachusetts. In 1998, they changed their community's name to Capuchin Sisters of Nazareth. After 2003 they moved to Tunkhannock, Pennsylvania in the Diocese of Scranton.

References

External links 
 
 Profile by the Institute on Religious Life

Franciscan Friars of the Renewal
Christian organizations established in 1995
Franciscan organizations
Roman Catholic Archdiocese of Boston